Days of Our Lives: A Very Salem Christmas, directed by Noel Maxam, is an American Christmas film based on the daytime soap opera television series, Days of Our Lives. It premiered on Peacock on December 16, 2021.

Premise
Will Horton (Chandler Massey) writes a script involving the residents of his hometown, Salem, Illinois, before his Christmas Eve deadline.

Cast

Main
 Deidre Hall as Marlena Evans
 Drake Hogestyn as John Black
 Alison Sweeney as Sami Brady
 Jackée Harry as Paulina Price
 Arianne Zucker as Nicole DiMera
 Eric Martsolf as Brady Black
 Camila Banus as Gabi Hernandez
 Paul Telfer as Xander Kiriakis
 Daniel Feuerriegel as EJ DiMera
 Blake Berris as Nick Fallon
 Lucas Adams as Tripp Dalton
 Lindsay Arnold as Allie Horton
 Raven Bowens as Chanel Dupree
 Carson Boatman as Johnny DiMera
 Chandler Massey as Will Horton
 Zach Tinker as Sonny Kiriakis
 Greg Rikaart as Leo Stark
 Evelyn Stephenson as Sydney DiMera
 Billy Flynn as Chad DiMera
 Eileen Davidson as Kristen Black
 Greg Vaughan as Eric Brady

Production
On November 15, 2021, Davidson announced the first Days of Our Lives movie, A Very Salem Christmas for Peacock at The Real Housewives Ultimate Girls Trip event in Malibu. Along with the announcement, it was revealed Davidson and Massey would star. On November 22, 2021, it was announced Sweeney had also been cast; the film's full cast list was revealed later the same day.

References

External links
 
 

American television films
2021 films
American Christmas films
Days of Our Lives
Films based on television series
Peacock (streaming service) original films
2020s English-language films